St. John's Methodist Church may refer to:

St. John's Methodist Church (Georgetown, Delaware)
St. John's Methodist Church (Davenport, Iowa)
St. John's Methodist Church (Shelbyville, Kentucky)
St. John's Methodist Church, Arbroath